Guisha (Persian language: گیشا, also called Kuy-e Nasr کوی نصر), originally Kisha (from the names of its two founders, Keynejad and Shapourian), is a neighborhood in Tehran, Iran. The neighborhood was known as a center for youth recreation, shopping, and dating. Guisha is home to the marketplace Bazzar e Nasr (بازار نصر). The Iranian Bank of Agriculture is also headquartered in Guisha.

Neighbourhoods in Tehran